Tual (Indonesian: Kota Tual) is a city in Maluku Province of Indonesia located within the Kei Islands. In 2007, it was separated from the rest of the Kei Islands, which form the Southeast Maluku Regency to form an independent city. 

The city consists of two principal islands (Kei Besar to the east and Kei Kecil to the west) together with over 190 smaller offshore islands. It includes the urbanized Dullah Island (Indonesian:Pulau Dullah) which is situated to the northeast of the much larger Kei Kecil, and includes a further number of small islands to the west of the principal Kei Kecil.

History

Early history

Colonial era

Recent history

Geography 
The city comprises four main groups of islands: Kei Besar, Kei Kecil, Tayando Islands, and Kur Islands. Kei Kecil and Tayando Islands have a maximum altitude of around 100 meters above the sea, while Kur Islands has an altitude of around 400 meters and Kei Besar's topography varies between 500 and 800 meters above sea level. The city has a small slope between 0 to 25 degrees, most of it generally considered to be a low-lying region. However, there are several points within the city boundaries that have steep slopes above 45 degrees. Kei Besar's topography varies from the others by having a karst formation in the middle of it. 

The majority of the soils in the city are latosol, podzol, and rendzina. The soils generally are fertile and have good drainage, with the inhabitants using the land for agriculture, especially during the rainy season, growing various tubers.

Climate 
Tual has a tropical rainforest climate (Af) with moderate rainfall from July to October and heavy to very heavy rainfall from November to June.

Governance

Administrative districts 

The city as of 2010 was divided into four districts (kecamatan), but subsequently in 2018 a fifth district — Kur Selatan (South Kur) — was created from part of Pulau-Pulau Kur District. These are tabulated below with their areas and their populations as of the 2010 census and 2020 census. The table also includes the number of administrative villages (urban kelurahan and rural desa) in each district, and its post code.

Economy 
The city produced 3.9 tons of galangal, 3.7 tons of turmeric, and 2.02 tons of ginger in 2019. This is a sharp decrease from the previous year, in which the city produced 11 tons of galangal, 4.2 tons of turmeric, and 3.45 tons of ginger, suggesting a decline in the agricultural sector and a shift to the industry and service sectors. Other agricultural commodities such as sweet potatoes and cassava also experienced a decline in production, from 21 tons to 14 tons and 107 tons to 76 tons, respectively. Another sector, fishery, contributes significantly to the local economy, in which there were 30,638 tons of seafood products from the city in 2019, ranging from tuna to shrimp. In the industry sector, fish meal production is the main industry product with an investment value of more than $680,000. There are 12 registered restaurants in the city, not counting informal restaurants and shops. Unemployment rate was 9.3% as of 2019.

As the city's location is isolated and dependent on logistics from the sea, it is very prone to high inflation. The inflation rate in 2020 was 1.15%, which was the highest inflation rate in Indonesia that year.

Demographics 
Around 75% of the population are Muslim, 25% are Christian, 0.08% are Hindu, and 0.01% are Buddhist. The city's life expectancy is 65.21. There are more females than males, making up around 51.34% of the city population.

Education 
There are fifteen kindergartens, sixty-four elementary schools, thirty junior high schools, fourteen senior high schools, and six vocational high schools both public and private. In addition, there are three higher education institutions.

Healthcare 
The city only has one hospital, but is also supported by two clinics, nineteen puskesmas, and one central pharmacy. The only hospital in the city, Maren Hi Noho Renuat Regional Hospital, is owned by city government and undergoing an expansion expected to be completed in 2021. There are also 18 family planning clinics as of 2019. There are exactly 100 mosques and 24 churches in the city.

Culture and entertainment

Transportation 
187,72 kilometers out of 353,59 kilometers of roads in the city are paved using asphalt. Angkots exist in the city and are the only available form of public transportation. Other informal taxis and motorcycle taxis also exist, but online transportation services such as Grab and Gojek have not yet established a presence . The closest airport is Karel Sadsuitubun Airport and Dumatubin Airport which are located around 10 minutes' journey from the city. The city is also served by Pelni to connect it to other neighboring islands and regions.

Media 
The city and neighbouring regions have access to 4G internet service, in addition to other basic telecommunication services such as the telephone. There are also some public Wi-Fi spots provided by the government. The only fiber optic connection provider is IndiHome, which is state-owned under Telkom Indonesia.

Notes

References

 
Populated places in Maluku (province)
Cities in Indonesia